The Crown of Aragon was a composite monarchy ruled by one king, originated by the dynastic union of the Kingdom of Aragon and the County of Barcelona and ended as a consequence of the War of the Spanish Succession. At the height of its power in the 14th and 15th centuries, the Crown of Aragon was a thalassocracy controlling a large portion of present-day eastern Spain, parts of what is now southern France, and a Mediterranean empire which included the Balearic Islands, Sicily, Corsica, Sardinia, Malta, Southern Italy (from 1442) and parts of Greece (until 1388).

The component realms of the Crown were not united politically except at the level of the king, who ruled over each autonomous polity according to its own laws, raising funds under each tax structure, dealing separately with each Corts or Cortes, particularly the Kingdom of Aragon, the Principality of Catalonia, the Kingdom of Majorca, and the Kingdom of Valencia. The larger Crown of Aragon must not be confused with one of its constituent parts, the Kingdom of Aragon, from which it takes its name.

In 1479, a new dynastic union of the Crown of Aragon with the Crown of Castile by the Catholic Monarchs, joining what contemporaries referred to as "the Spains", led to what would become the Spanish composite monarchy under Habsburg monarchs. The Aragonese Crown continued existing until it was abolished by the Nueva Planta decrees issued by King Philip V in 1716 as a consequence of the defeat of Archduke Charles (as Charles III of Aragon) in the War of the Spanish Succession.

Context
Formally, the political center of the Crown of Aragon was Zaragoza, where kings were crowned at La Seo Cathedral. The 'de facto' capital and leading cultural, administrative and economic centre of the Crown of Aragon was Barcelona, followed by Valencia. Finally, Palma (Majorca) was an additional important city and seaport.

The Crown of Aragon eventually included the Kingdom of Aragon, the Principality of Catalonia (until the 12th century the County of Barcelona and others), the Kingdom of Valencia, the Kingdom of Majorca, the Kingdom of Sicily, Malta, the Kingdom of Naples and Kingdom of Sardinia. For brief periods the Crown of Aragon also controlled Montpellier, Provence, Corsica, and the twin Duchy of Athens and Neopatras in Latin Greece.

In the Late Middle Ages, the southward territorial expansion of the Aragonese Crown in the Iberian Peninsula stopped in Murcia, which eventually consolidated as a realm of the Crown of Castile, the Kingdom of Murcia. Subsequently, the Aragonese Crown focused on the Mediterranean, governing as far afield as Greece and the Barbary Coast, whereas Portugal, which completed its southward expansion in 1249, would focus on the Atlantic Ocean. Mercenaries from the territories in the Crown, known as Almogavars participated in the creation of this Mediterranean empire, and later found employment in countries all across southern Europe.

The Crown of Aragon has been considered an empire which ruled in the Mediterranean for hundreds of years, with thalassocratic power to setting rules over the entire sea, (as documented, for instance, in the Llibre del Consolat del Mar or Book of the Consulate of the Sea, written in Catalan, is one of the oldest compilations of maritime laws in the world).

However, the different territories were only connected through the person of the monarch, an aspect of empire seen as early as Achaemenid Persia. A modern historian, Juan de Contreras y Lopez de Ayala, Marqués de Lozoya described the Crown of Aragon as being more like a confederacy than a centralised kingdom.

Origin
The Crown of Aragon originated in 1137, when the Kingdom of Aragon and the County of Barcelona (along with the County of Provence, Girona, Cerdanya, Osona and other territories) merged by dynastic union upon the marriage of Petronilla of Aragon and Raymond Berenguer IV of Barcelona; their individual titles combined in the person of their son Alfonso II of Aragon, who ascended to the throne in 1162. This union respected the existing institutions and parliaments of both territories. The combined state was initially known as Regno, Dominio et Corona Aragonum et Catalonie, and later as Corona Regum Aragoniae, Corona Aragonum or simply Aragon.

Petronilla's father King Ramiro, "The Monk" (reigned 1134–1137) who was raised in the Monastery of Saint Pons de Thomières, Viscounty of Béziers as a Benedictine monk was the youngest of three brothers. His brothers Peter I (reigned 1094–1104) and Alfonso I El Batallador (The Battler, reigned 1104–1134) had bravely fought against Castile for hegemony in the Iberian peninsula. Upon the death of Alfonso I, the Aragonese nobility that campaigned close to him feared being overwhelmed by the influence of Castile. And so, Ramiro was forced to leave his monastic life and proclaim himself King of Aragon. He married Agnes, sister of the Duke of Aquitaine and betrothed his only daughter Petronilla of Aragon to Raymond Berenguer IV, Count of Barcelona. The wedding agreement provided Berenguer with the title of Princeps Aragonum and Dominator Aragonensis (Ruler of the Kingdom and Commander of the Aragonese Military) but the title of King of Aragon was reserved for Ramiro II and Berenguer's future sons.

Raymond Berenguer IV, the first ruler of the united dynasty, called himself Count of Barcelona and "Prince of Aragon".

Expansion

Alfonso II inherited two realms and with them, two different expansion processes. The House of Jiménez looked south in a battle against Castile for the control of the middle valley of the Ebro in the Iberian peninsula. The House of Barcelona looked north to its origins, Occitania, where through family ties it had significant influence, especially in Toulouse, Provence and Foix, towards the south along the Mediterranean coast and towards the Mediterranean sea.

Soon, Alfonso II of Aragon and Barcelona committed to conquering Valencia as the Aragonese nobility demanded. Like his father, he gave priority to the expansion and consolidation of the House of Barcelona's influence in Occitania.

Alfonso II signed the treaties of Cazorla, a multilateral treaty between Navarre, Aragón, León, Portugal, and Castile to redefine the frontiers and zones of expansion of each kingdom. Alfonso II assured Valencia by renouncing the Aragonese rights of annexing Murcia in exchange for securing the Aragonese frontier with Castile. This action should be seen as result of the aforementioned priority given over the Occitan and Catalan dominions of the Crown of Aragon.

From the ninth century, the dukes of Aquitaine, the kings of Navarre, the counts of Foix, the counts of Toulouse and the counts of Barcelona were rivals in their attempts at controlling the various counties of the Hispanic Marches and pays of Occitania. And the House of Barcelona succeeded in extending its influence to the area that is now south of France through strong family ties, in the areas of the County of Provence, County of Toulouse and County of Foix. The rebellion of the Cathars or Albigensians, who rejected the authority and teachings of the Catholic Church, led to the loss of these possessions in southern France. Pope Innocent III called upon Philip II of France to suppress the Albigensians—the Albigensian Crusade, which led to bringing Occitania firmly under the control of the King of France, and the Capetian dynasty from northern France.

Peter II of Aragon returned from the Battle of Las Navas de Tolosa in autumn 1212 to find that Simon de Montfort, 5th Earl of Leicester, had conquered Toulouse, exiling Count Raymond VI of Toulouse, who was Peter's brother-in-law and vassal. Peter's army crossed the Pyrenees and arrived at Muret where they were joined by Raymond of Foix and Raymond of Toulouse's forces, in September 1213 to confront Montfort's army. The Battle of Muret began on 12 September 1213. The Catalan, Aragonese and Occitan forces were disorganised and disintegrated under the assault of Montfort's squadrons. Peter himself was caught in the thick of fighting, and died as a result of a foolhardy act of bravado. Thus, the nobility of Toulouse, Foix and other vassals of the Crown of Aragon were defeated. The conflict concluded with the Treaty of Meaux-Paris in 1229, in which the Crown of Aragon agreed to renounce its rights over the south of Occitania with the integration of these territories into the dominions of the King of France.

King James I (13th century) returned to an era of expansion to the South, by conquering and incorporating Majorca, Ibiza, and a good share of the Kingdom of Valencia into the Crown. With the Treaty of Corbeil (1258), which was based upon the principle of natural frontiers, the Capetians were recognized as heirs of the Carolingian dynasty, and the Capetian king Louis IX renounced any claim of feudal overlordship over Catalonia. The general principle was clear, Catalan influence north of the Pyrenees, beyond the Roussillon, Vallespir, Conflent and Capcir, was to cease. James I had realized that wasting his forces and distracting his energies in attempts to keep a footing in France would only end in disaster. In January 1266, James I besieged and captured Murcia, then settled his own men, mostly Catalans, there; and handed Murcia over to Castile with the treaty of Cazorla.

The Kingdom of Majorca, including the Balearic Islands, and the counties of Cerdanya and Roussillon-Vallespir and the city of Montpellier, was held independently from 1276 to 1279 by James II of Majorca and as a vassal of the Crown of Aragon after that date until 1349, becoming a full member of the Crown of Aragon from 1349.

Valencia was finally made a new kingdom with its own institutions and not an extension of Aragón as the Aragonese noblemen had intended since even before the creation of the Crown of Aragon. The Kingdom of Valencia became the third member of the crown together with Aragon and Catalonia. The Kingdom of Majorca had an independent status with its own kings until 1349.
In 1282, the Sicilians rose up against the second dynasty of the Angevins on the Sicilian Vespers and massacred the garrison soldiers throughout the island. Peter III responded to their call, and landed in Trapani to an enthusiastic welcome five months later. This caused Pope Martin IV to excommunicate the king, place Sicily under interdiction, and offer the kingdom of Aragon to a son of Philip III of France.

When Peter III refused to impose the Charters of Aragon in Valencia, the nobles and towns united in Zaragoza to demand a confirmation of their privileges, which the king had to accept in 1283. Thus began the Union of Aragon, which developed the power of the Justícia to mediate between the king and the Aragonese bourgeois. 

When James II of Aragon completed the conquest of the kingdom of Valencia, the Crown of Aragon established itself as one of the major powers in Europe.

In 1297, to solve the dispute between the Anjevins and the Aragonese over Sicily, Pope Boniface VIII created ex novo a Kingdom of Sardinia and Corsica and entrusted it as a fief to the Aragonese King James II, ignoring already existing, indigenous states. In 1324, James II finally started to seize the Pisan territories in the former states of Cagliari and Gallura. In 1347 Aragon made war on the Genoese Doria and Malaspina houses, which controlled most of the lands of the former Logudoro state in north-western Sardinia, and added them to its direct domains. The Giudicato of Arborea, the only remaining independent Sardinian state, proved far more difficult to subdue. The rulers of Arborea developed the ambition to unite all of Sardinia under their rule and create a single Sardinian state, and at a certain point (1368–1388, 1392–1409) almost managed to drive the Aragonese out. The war between Arborea and Aragon was fought on and off for more than 100 years; this situation lasted until 1409, when the army of Arborea suffered a heavy defeat by the Aragonese army in the Battle of Sanluri; the capital Oristano was lost in 1410. After some years during which Arborean rulers failed to organise a successful resurgence, they sold their remaining rights for 100,000 gold florins, and by 1420 the Aragonese Kingdom of Sardinia finally extended throughout the island. The subduing of Sardinia having taken a century, Corsica, which had never been wrested from the Genoese, was dropped from the formal title of the Kingdom.

Through the marriage of Peter IV to Maria of Sicily (1381), the Kingdom of Sicily, as well as the duchies of Athens and Neopatria, were finally implemented more firmly into the Crown. The Greek possessions were permanently lost to Nerio I Acciaioli in 1388 and Sicily was dissociated in the hands of Martin I from 1395 to 1409, but the Kingdom of Naples was added finally in 1442 by the conquest led by Alfonso V.

The King's possessions outside of the Iberian Peninsula and Balearic Islands were ruled by proxy through local elites as petty kingdoms, rather than subjected directly to a centralised government. They were more an economic part of the Crown of Aragon than a political one.

The fact that the King was keen on settling new kingdoms instead of merely expanding the existing kingdoms was a part of a power struggle that pitted the interests of the king against those of the existing nobility. This process was also under way in most of the European states that successfully effected the transition to the Early Modern state. Thus, the new territories gained from the Moors—namely Valencia and Majorca—were given furs as an instrument of self-government in order to limit the power of nobility in these new acquisitions and, at the same time, increase their allegiance to the monarchy itself. The trend in the neighbouring kingdom of Castile was quite similar, both kingdoms giving impetus to the Reconquista by granting different grades of self-government either to cities or territories, instead of placing the new territories under the direct rule of nobility.

Union with Castile

In 1410, King Martin I died without living descendants or heirs. As a result, by the Pact of Caspe, Ferdinand of Antequera from the Castilian dynasty of Trastámara, received the Crown of Aragon as Ferdinand I of Aragon.

Later, his grandson King Ferdinand II of Aragon recovered the northern Catalan counties—Roussillon and Cerdagne—which had been lost to France as well as the kingdom of Navarre, which had recently joined the Crown of Aragon but had been lost after internal dynastic disputes.

In 1469, Ferdinand married Infanta Isabella of Castile, half-sister of King Henry IV of Castile, who became Queen of Castile and León after Henry's death in 1474. Their marriage was a dynastic union which became the constituent event for the dawn of the Kingdom of Spain. At that point both the Castile and the Crown of Aragon remained distinct territories, each keeping its own traditional institutions, parliaments and laws. The process of territorial consolidation was completed when King Charles I, known as Emperor Charles V, in 1516 united all the kingdoms on the Iberian peninsula, save the Kingdoms of Portugal and the Algarve, under one monarch—his co-monarch and mother Queen Joanna I in confinement—thereby furthering the creation of the Spanish state, albeit a decentralised one.

Dissolution
The literary evocation of past splendour recalls correctly the great age of the 13th and 14th centuries, when Majorca, Valencia and Sicily were conquered, the population growth could be handled without social conflict, and the urban prosperity, which peaked in 1345, created the institutional and cultural achievements of the Crown.
The Aragonese crown's wealth and power stagnated and its authority was steadily transferred to the new Spanish crown after that date—the demographic growth was partially offset by the expulsion of the Jews from Spain (1492), Muslims (1502) and the expulsion of the Moriscos (1609). It was unable to prevent the loss of Roussillon in 1659, the loss of Minorca and its Italian domains in 1707–1716, and the imposition of French language on Roussillon (1700) and Castilian as the language of government in all the old Aragonese Crown lands in Spain (1707–1716).

The Crown of Aragon and its institutions were abolished in 1716 only after the War of the Spanish Succession (1701–1714) by the Nueva Planta decrees, issued by Philip V of Spain. The old regime was swept away, the administration was subsumed into the Castilian administration, the lands of the Crown were united formally with those of Castile to legally form a single state, the kingdom of Spain, as it moved towards a centralized government under the new Bourbon dynasty.

Nationalist revisionism

Some of the nationalist movements in Spain consider the former kingdoms of the Crown of Aragon to be the foundation of their nations, the Catalan nationalist movement being the most prominent. Spanish nationalism, on the other hand, tends to place more importance on the later dynastic union with the Crown of Castile, considering it the origin of one Spanish nation.

The reprisals inflicted on the territories that had fought against Philip V in the War of Succession is given by some Valencian nationalists and Catalan nationalists as an argument against the centralism of Spanish nationalism and in favor of federalism, confederation, or even independence. Some Catalans associated their ancient privileges with their Generalitat and resistance to Castile. Because restoration of fueros was one of its tenets, Carlism won support in the lands of the Crown of Aragon during the 19th century.

The Romanticism of the 19th century Catalan Renaixença movement evoked a "Pyrenean realm" that corresponded more to the vision of 13th century troubadours than to the historical reality of the Crown. This vision survives today as "a nostalgic programme of politicised culture". Thus, the history of the Crown of Aragon remains a politically loaded topic in modern Spain, especially when it comes to asserting the level of independence enjoyed by constituents of the Crown, like the Principality of Catalonia, which is sometimes used  to justify the level of autonomy (or independence) that should be enjoyed by contemporary Catalonia and other territories.

Pennon

The origin of Coat of arms of the Crown of Aragon is the familiar coat of the Counts of Barcelona and Kings of Aragon. The Pennon was used exclusively by the monarchs of the Crown and was expressive of their sovereignty. James III of Majorca, vassal of the Kingdom of Aragon, used a coat of arms with four bars, as seen on the Leges palatinae miniatures.

Institutions
Aragon, Catalonia and Valencia each had a legislative body, known as the Cortes in Aragon or Corts in Catalonia and Valencia. A Diputación del General or Diputació del General was established in each, becoming known as a Generalidad in Aragon and Generalitat in Catalonia and Valencia. From the 15th century onwards, every realm of the Crown was granted its own Royal Audience.

Capital
The house of the Crown was the Cathedral of the Savior of Zaragoza from Peter II (12th century). The parliament used to gather at Monzón (13th to 16th centuries), the remaining meetings took place at Fraga, Zaragoza, Calatayud and Tarazona. The councillor headquarters were located at Barcelona (13th to 16th centuries) and Naples during the kingdom of Alfonso V.

On the other hand, the General Archive of the Crown of Aragon, which was the official repository of royal documentation of the Crown since the reign of Alfonso II (12th century), was located in the Monastery of Santa María de Sigena until the year 1301 and then moved to Barcelona.

In the early 15th century, the de facto capital was Valencia until Alfonso V came to the throne.
During the 15th and the 16th centuries, the Crown's de facto capital was Naples. After Alfonso V of Aragon, Ferdinand II of Aragon settled the capital in Naples. Alfonso, in particular, wanted to transform Naples into a real Mediterranean capital and lavished huge sums to embellish it further. Later the courts were itinerant until Philip II of Spain. The Spanish historian Domingo Buesa Conde has argued that Zaragoza ought to be considered the permanent political capital, but not the economic or administrative capital, owing to the obligation for kings to be crowned at the Cathedral of the Savior of Zaragoza.

Culture 
During the Crown of Aragon, the Catalan culture and language underwent a vigorous expansion. During the period of trade, Occitan-Catalan contributions to Maltese occurred.

King Fernando II and Queen Isabella, as the Catholic Monarchs who began the Inquisition, were contrary to the more plural development that preceded in the Crown of Aragon. The previous religious background was described as "longstanding tradition of Mudejarism, the royal sanctioning and protection of subject Muslim populations within Christian realms." Aesthetic Mudéjar architecture of Aragon has been observed as demonstrating the influence of Andalusian and Arab culture in Aragon proper. Gothic architecture was also developed.

The Mediterranean Lingua Franca was a mixed language used widely for commerce and diplomacy and was also current among slaves of the bagnio, Barbary pirates and European renegades in precolonial Algiers. Among the speakers who created the language, also called Sabir, were Muslims from Aragon called "Tagarins" (a term mentioned by Miguel Cervantes). Historically, the first to use it were the Genoese and Venetian trading colonies in the eastern Mediterranean after the year 1000.

The similarities contribute to discussions of the classification of Lingua Franca as a language. Although its official classification is that of a pidgin, some scholars adamantly oppose that classification and believe it would be better viewed as an interlanguage of Italian.

Linguist Steven Dworkin hypothesized that Catalan was the point of entry for Mediterranean Lingua Franca terms into Spain, arguably the source of several Italian and Arabic loanwords in Spanish, citing the DCECH.

Composition
The crown was made up of the following territories (which are nowadays parts of the modern countries of Spain, France, Italy, Greece, Malta, and Andorra).

Sort by "Earliest annexion" to see the states in the chronological order they were joined to the crown.

Coat of arms of the kings of the Crown of Aragon

See also
 List of Aragonese monarchs
 List of Sicilian monarchs
 Prince of Girona
 Great Catalan Company

Notes

References

Bibliography

External links

 Archive of the Crown of Aragon, pl. del Rei, Barcelona.
 Catalan literature in Crown of Aragon

 
Former countries on the Iberian Peninsula
Aragon
Medieval Spain
Spanish monarchy
Former confederations
1162 establishments in Europe
States and territories disestablished in 1714
1714 disestablishments in Spain
History of Catalonia
12th-century establishments in Spain
Aragon
Former countries in Europe